The Moroccan Royal Guard is officially part of the Royal Moroccan Army. However it is under the direct operational control of the Royal Military Household of His Majesty the King. The sole duty of the guard is to provide for the security and safety of the King and royal family of Morocco.

History
The Alaouite Sultan Moulay Ismail created the 'Abid al-Bukhari at the beginning of the 18th century, a military corps of black slaves organized into permanent infantry and cavalry units. The corps was unofficially referred to as the "Black Guard" because its members were recruited from the Haratin, a black people from southern Morocco and/or originally from Sub-Saharan Africa, as well as from other black inhabitants of the region. The name 'Abid al-Bukhari came from their practice of swearing their oaths of service upon a copy of the Sahih al-Bukhari, a famous collection of hadiths compiled by Muhammad al-Bukhari.   

The Guard was formerly known as the Cherifian Guard (because the King is a sharif or descendant of the Prophet Muhammad), the name was changed to Royal Guard after Morocco gained its independence in 1956. The Haratines are no longer part of the Royal Guard today.

Organization 

The Guard is currently organized as a Regiment of 6,000 troops as follows;
4 Infantry Battalions, each of 25 officers and 1,000 troops.
2 Cavalry Squadrons.

Other Guard units

The King is always accompanied by units of the Royal Guard whenever he is on Moroccan soil. All members of the Royal Guard wear a red beret. Red full dress uniforms of traditional style (white in summer) are worn by both cavalry and infantry on ceremonial occasions.

The King is also protected by two other units of the Royal Moroccan Army.  They are, however, not an official part of the Royal Guard. These are:

 The elite Parachute Brigade headquartered in Rabat (number of troops unknown).
 The Light Security Brigade of 2,000 troops.

Weapons

Rifles
 SAR-21
 M16A2
 FN FAL
 AK-47
 M4A1

Submachine guns
 Heckler & Koch MP5

Pistols
 Beretta 92FS

Machine Guns
 FN MAG
 AA-52

Heavy machine gun
 M2 Browning
 ZPU-2

Rocket launchers
 RPG-7
 RPG-9

Anti-tank missiles
 BGM-71 TOW

Mortars
 L16 81mm Mortar
 M120 120 mm mortar

Self-propelled artillery
 M40 GMC

Combat vehicles
 Humvee

Former commanders
General Mohamed Medbouh
General Abdesalam Sefrioui

See also
 Royal guard
 Imperial guard
 National guard
 Military of Morocco
 Republican guard

References

Much of the content of this article comes from the equivalent French-language Wikipedia article, accessed December 19, 2006.

Royal Guard, Moroccan
Royal guards
Guards regiments
Royal Guard, Moroccan
Military units and formations established in 1956